Kirkgunzeon railway station served the village of Kirkgunzeon, Dumfries and Galloway, Scotland from 1859 to 1950 on the Castle Douglas and Dumfries Railway.

History 
The station opened on 7 November 1859 by the Glasgow and South Western Railway. The goods yard and the signal box, which opened in 1878, were to the east. The signal box closed in 1946, being replaced by a ground frame. The station closed to passengers on 2 January 1950 and closed to goods on 1 July 1959. The site is now a caravan park.

References

External links 

Disused railway stations in Dumfries and Galloway
Railway stations in Great Britain opened in 1859
Railway stations in Great Britain closed in 1950
Former Glasgow and South Western Railway stations
1859 establishments in Scotland
1959 disestablishments in Scotland